Stadion Rudolfa Labaje is a football stadium located in the town of Třinec in the Czech Republic.  It is currently the home ground of football side FK Třinec. The stadium is named after Rudolf Łabaj, a famous local Polish footballer who played for the club.

It is one of the smallest stadiums in the Czech 2. Liga with a capacity of about 2,200.

External links
 Information at FK Fotbal Třinec website
 Stadium information

FK Fotbal Třinec
Football venues in the Czech Republic
Sport in Třinec
Sports venues in the Moravian-Silesian Region
Sports venues completed in 1966
1966 establishments in Czechoslovakia
20th-century architecture in the Czech Republic